Soye-en-Septaine is a commune in the Cher department in the Centre-Val de Loire region of France.

Geography

Population

Sights
 The church of Notre-Dame, dating from the nineteenth century.
 The twelfth-century church of St. Pardoux (closed).

See also
Communes of the Cher department

References

Communes of Cher (department)